Great Cowden is a hamlet in the East Riding of Yorkshire, England, in an area known as Holderness.

Great Cowden forms part of the civil parish of Mappleton.

In 1823 Cowden (as Great and Little Cowden) was also known as 'Coldon', and was in the parish of Mappleton. The parish incumbent's living was under the patronage of the King, although at the time the parish church had been swallowed by the sea. Population was 146, with occupations including eleven farmers.

References

External links

Villages in the East Riding of Yorkshire
Holderness